Gurovo is a rural locality (a passing loop) in Mikhaylovka Urban Okrug, Volgograd Oblast, Russia. The population was 4 as of 2010.

References 

Rural localities in Mikhaylovka urban okrug